Katakhal Junction railway station is a main railway station in Hailakandi district, Assam. Its code is KTX. It serves Katakhal town. The station consists of two platforms.

Major trains

 Dullavcherra–Badarpur Passenger
 Dullavcherra–Silchar Fast Passenger
 Maishashan–Silchar Passenger
 Agartala–Silchar Express
 Silchar–Bhairabi Passenger
Guwahati–Silchar Express
Silchar–Dharmanagar Passenger
Silchar guwahati express

References

Railway stations in Assam
Lumding railway division